The 2016 Saskatchewan general election, was held on April 4, 2016, to elect members of the Legislative Assembly of Saskatchewan. The Lieutenant Governor dissolved the Legislature on March 8, 2016, setting the election date for April 4. The election resulted in the Saskatchewan Party winning its third majority government. This is the first time in 90 years that a party other than the Saskatchewan New Democratic Party (NDP) or its predecessor, the Saskatchewan Co-operative Commonwealth Federation (CCF) has won three consecutive majority governments in Saskatchewan. It is also the first time that a centre-right party has won three consecutive elections in the province.

Date
Under The Legislative Assembly Act, 2007 (Saskatchewan), the election "must be held" on the first Monday of November in the fourth calendar year following the previous election. As the last election was held in 2011, that date would be November 2, 2015. However, the act also provides that if the election period would overlap with a federal election period, the provincial election is to be postponed until the first Monday of the following April. Under the federal fixed-term act, the 42nd general election occurred on October 19, 2015, overlapping election periods by approximately two weeks. Because the federal Conservatives called the election on August 2, 2015 for October 19, the Saskatchewan election was held on April 4, 2016, even though the Lieutenant Governor retained the power to dissolve the Legislative Assembly early on the Premier's advice.

Results
Due to an increase in the number of ridings (from 58 to 61), both parties increased their total number of seats.

The Saskatchewan Party maintained its sweep of the southern and central rural ridings, and also held on to a majority of seats in Regina and Saskatoon. The NDP seemed to have some momentum after winning federal seats for the first time in a decade at the 2015 federal election. However, it was unable to recover much of the ground it lost in its severe defeat of almost five years earlier. The NDP gained one seat each in Regina and Prince Albert but lost one in Saskatoon for an overall net gain of one seat, and for the second consecutive election saw its leader unseated in his own riding; Cam Broten was defeated in the reconfigured riding of Saskatoon Westview by a slim margin of 232 votes. The results reflected the opinion polling done prior to the election, with the popular vote falling within the margins of error, though the Saskatchewan Party won more seats than what was projected.

Election summary

|-
!rowspan="2" colspan="2"|Party
!rowspan="2"|Leader
!rowspan="2"|Candidates
!colspan="4"|Seats
!colspan="3"|Popular vote
|-
!2011
!Dissol.
!2016
!+/-
!Votes
!%
!% change

|align=left|Brad Wall
|61 ||49 ||47 ||51 || +2 || 270,776 || 62.53% || -1.72

|align=left|Cam Broten
|61 ||9 |||9||10 || +1 || 131,137 || 30.28% || -1.69

|align=left|Darrin Lamoureux
|61 ||– ||– || 0 || – || 15,568 || 3.60% ||+3.04

|align=left|Victor Lau
|58 ||– ||– || 0 || – || 7,967 || 1.84% ||-1.03

|align=left|Rick Swenson
|18 ||– ||– || 0 || – || 5,571 || 1.29% ||+0.96

|align=left|Frank Serfas
|4 ||– ||– || 0 || – || 318 || +0.06% ||

| colspan="2" style="text-align:left;"|Independent
|5 ||– ||– || 0 || – || 1,693 || +0.38% ||

| colspan="3" style="text-align:left;"|Vacant
|– ||2 || colspan="5" 
|-
| style="text-align:left;" colspan="3"|Total
|268 ||58 ||58 ||61 || || 433,030 || 100% ||
|}

Percentages

Detailed analysis

Incumbents not contesting their seats

Retiring incumbents

Opinion polls

Riding-by-riding results
People in bold represent cabinet ministers and the speaker. Party leaders are italicized. The symbols ** indicates MLAs who are not running again.

Northwest Saskatchewan

Northeast Saskatchewan

West Central Saskatchewan

Southwest Saskatchewan

Southeast Saskatchewan

Saskatoon

Regina

References

2016 elections in Canada
2016
April 2016 events in Canada
2016 in Saskatchewan